Duje Ćaleta-Car (born 17 September 1996) is a Croatian professional footballer who plays as a centre-back for Premier League club Southampton and the Croatia national team. He was a member of the Croatian squad which ended as runners-up to France in the 2018 FIFA World Cup.

Club career

Early career
Ćaleta-Car joined FC Liefering in 2014 from FC Pasching. He made his Austrian Football First League debut with FC Liefering on 25 July 2014 against FAC Team für Wien.

Red Bull Salzburg

During the 2017–18 season Salzburg had their best ever European campaign. They finished top of their Europa League group, for a record fourth time, before beating Real Sociedad and Borussia Dortmund thus making their first ever appearance in a UEFA Europa League semi-final. On 3 May 2018, he played in the Europa League semi-final as Marseille played out a 1–2 away loss but a 3–2 aggregate win to secure a place in the 2018 UEFA Europa League Final.

Marseille

On 20 July 2018, Ćaleta-Car joined Marseille on a five-year deal for a transfer fee of €19 million. Upon his arrival, Ćaleta-Car was given the squad shirt number 15.

On 29 September 2019, he scored his first goal for Marseille, the equalizer in a 1–1 draw with Rennes.

At the start of the 2020–21 season, Ćaleta-Car scored a brace against Brest, converting assists of Florian Thauvin, as Marseille won 3–2. At the end of the January 2021 transfer window, Premier League side Liverpool launched a £23 million bid to secure his services but the move failed to materialize as Marseille didn't have enough time to sign a replacement.

Southampton 
On 1 September 2022, Ćaleta-Car joined Southampton on a four-year contract.

International career

In October 2015, Ćaleta-Car received a first call-up for the senior national team for the Euro 2016 qualifying matches against Bulgaria and Malta, as a replacement for injured Jozo Šimunović. He was in the first 27 players team called for the Euro 2016 but was dropped along with midfielder Alen Halilović and goalkeeper Dominik Livaković.

In May 2018, he was named in Croatia's preliminary 32-man squad for the 2018 World Cup in Russia. On 3 June, he made his international debut in a friendly match against Brazil, coming on as a substitute for Vedran Ćorluka in the 52nd minute.

Ćaleta-Car was eventually selected in the 23-man squad that travelled to the 2018 FIFA World Cup in Russia. He made his World Cup debut in Croatia's final group game, a 2–1 win over Iceland. Croatia would go on to finish second in the tournament, losing to France 4–2 in the final which was played at the Luzhniki Stadium in Moscow.

In June 2019, he refused to be part of Croatia squad for 2019 UEFA Under-21 Euro, citing exhaustion and the club's demand to take a rest for the upcoming season as reasons. Soon it was discovered that the real reason was a vacation in the Maldives with his club teammate Nemanja Radonjić. As a disciplinary action, he was the only outfield player who wasn't given even a minute of playing time in senior Croatia squad's June fixtures against Wales and Tunisia and was completely dropped ahead of September fixtures against Slovakia and Azerbaijan. In an interview with Sportske novosti, he denied going on the vacation and said that the sole reason of not participating in the tournament was suggestion of his club coaches Andoni Zubizarreta and André Villas-Boas to take a rest instead since his previous season wasn't on the level it was expected to be, partially due to his participation in the World Cup the summer before, and that it wasn't his personal wish. He also claimed that the Croatia U21 manager Nenad Gračan "had lied and had disappointed him", that "it had hurt him to read the lies of the media" about the vacation, and that he accepted senior Croatia squad manager Zlatko Dalić's decision to drop him from the team. 

He was called up again ahead of Croatia's November fixtures against Slovakia and Georgia following suspensions of the standard starting defenders Dejan Lovren and Domagoj Vida. He was a starter in the decisive match against the former opponent, that ended up as a 3–1 win and saw Croatia qualify for Euro 2020.

Personal life
In May 2021, Ćaleta-Car married Adriana Đurđević in a ceremony at the top of the Revelin Fortress in Đurđević's native Dubrovnik. In August 2021, Ćaleta-Car and Đurđević became parents of a baby son, whom they named Mauro. In June 2022, Ćaleta-Car and Đurđević married in a church ceremony in the St. Ignatius Church in Dubrovnik.

Career statistics

Club

International

Scores and results list Croatia's goal tally first, score column indicates score after each Ćaleta-Car goal

Honours
Red Bull Salzburg
 Austrian Bundesliga: 2014–15, 2015–16, 2016–17, 2017–18
 Austrian Cup: 2014–15, 2015–16, 2016–17

Croatia
 FIFA World Cup runner-up: 2018
Individual
Austrian  Bundesliga Team of the Year:  2017–18
Orders
 Order of Duke Branimir: 2018

References

External links

1996 births
Living people
Sportspeople from Šibenik
Association football central defenders
Croatian footballers
Croatia youth international footballers
Croatia under-21 international footballers
Croatia international footballers
2018 FIFA World Cup players
UEFA Euro 2020 players
HNK Šibenik players
FC Juniors OÖ players
FC Liefering players
FC Red Bull Salzburg players
Olympique de Marseille players
Southampton F.C. players
First Football League (Croatia) players
Austrian Football Bundesliga players
Austrian Regionalliga players
Ligue 1 players
Premier League players
Croatian expatriate footballers
Expatriate footballers in Austria
Croatian expatriate sportspeople in Austria
Expatriate footballers in France
Croatian expatriate sportspeople in France
Expatriate footballers in England
Croatian expatriate sportspeople in England